The Integrated Archive of Short-Read and Array (TIARA) database contains personal genomic information obtained from next generation sequencing techniques and ultra-high-resolution comparative genomic hybridization.

See also
 Personal genomics

References

External links
 http://tiara.gmi.ac.kr

DNA sequencing
Genome databases